On Ice is a 1935 theatrical cartoon short in the Mickey Mouse film series, produced by Walt Disney Animation Studios. It was the 79th Mickey Mouse short film to be released, and the eighth of that year.

Plot
The cartoon revolves around three different storylines that all take place on a frozen lake during wintertime. In the first, Mickey helps Minnie learn how to skate. The second storyline has Goofy attempting to catch fish by dropping tobacco into the water and making the fish come up to spit. Donald pulls a prank on Pluto by putting ice skates on his feet and luring him out onto the ice in the third one. The subplots come together when Donald skates around with a kite on his back. The wind kicks up and sends him flying over the waterfall. Mickey hears his cries for help and saves him by pulling on the yarns of his sweater, sending him flying. Donald ends up landing right where Goofy is fishing.

Voice cast
 Mickey Mouse: Walt Disney
 Goofy: Pinto Colvig
 Minnie Mouse: Marcellite Garner
 Donald Duck: Clarence Nash
 Pluto: Pinto Colvig

Home media
The short was released on December 4, 2001, on Walt Disney Treasures: Mickey Mouse in Living Color, on December 7, 2004, on Walt Disney Treasures: The Complete Pluto: 1930-1947 and on February 7, 2023, on Mickey & Minnie: 10 Classic Shorts - Volume 1.

See also
Mickey Mouse (film series)

References

External links

1935 films
1930s color films
1935 animated films
Mickey Mouse short films
Donald Duck short films
Pluto (Disney) short films
Goofy (Disney) short films
1930s Disney animated short films
Films directed by Ben Sharpsteen
Films produced by Walt Disney
Films scored by Frank Churchill
Films scored by Leigh Harline
1930s American films